Metallothionein-1F is a protein that in humans is encoded by the MT1F gene.

References

Further reading